Matthew Stuart Cash (born 7 August 1997) is a professional footballer who plays as a right-back for  club Aston Villa and the Poland national team.

Cash started his career at Wycombe Wanderers and later the FAB Academy before he signed his first professional contract with Nottingham Forest and established himself as a regular at right-back. He signed for Aston Villa in September 2020.

Born in England, Cash has Polish grandparents on his mother's side. He received his Polish passport in October 2021, qualifying him to play for the Poland national team. He made his debut the following month, and represented the side at the 2022 FIFA World Cup.

Club career

Nottingham Forest
Cash signed with Nottingham Forest in October 2014, after spending 16-months with the FAB Football Academy based at Bisham Abbey. Cash had joined FAB after Wycombe Wanderers released him, due to financial problems forcing their youth teams to be disbanded, aged fourteen. He experienced his first games in professional football on loan at League Two club Dagenham & Redbridge, having joined them on 4 March 2016 on a one-month loan deal. He scored his first goal for the Daggers in a 3–1 defeat to Hartlepool United on 12 March 2016.

On 5 August 2016, Cash signed a three-year deal with Forest to keep him at the club until 2019. He made his first team debut a day later, starting in a 4–3 win over Burton Albion. Cash's early season form earned him praise, with former Forest defender Kenny Burns claiming that the midfielder's performances were putting those of some of the more experienced Forest players "to shame". However, on only his fifth appearance for Forest, Cash sustained a fracture to his tibia at the beginning of a 2–2 draw away to Aston Villa on 11 September 2016 which was expected to keep him out for three months.

Cash made his return from injury on 25 November as a 79th-minute substitute in a 5–2 defeat of Barnsley at Oakwell. Three days later Cash was linked with a £5 million transfer to Premier League side Chelsea, although Forest owner Fawaz Al-Hasawi subsequently took to social media to deny that the midfielder would be sold in the January transfer window. On 4 January 2017, Cash was the subject of a £6 million bid from Bundesliga side RB Leipzig. Having remained at Forest upon the closure of the January transfer window, Cash signed a new contract on 3 March 2017 to extend his current deal with the club until 2021.

Having changed squad number from 41 to 14, ankle ligament damage sustained during a pre-season friendly match with Girona deprived Cash of starting the first match of the 2017–18 season, with the injury reported to sideline the player for "around three months". He scored his first goal for Forest in a 5–2 win at Queens Park Rangers on 24 February 2018.

Cash scored the opening goal for Nottingham Forest in the 2019–20 season, in a 2–1 defeat against West Bromwich Albion. During the season, Forest manager Sabri Lamouchi began to utilise Cash as a right-back, after injuries to Tendayi Darikwa and later Carl Jenkinson. He made the right-back slot his own, and his impressive performances led to the Poland national team reportedly monitoring his progress ahead of a potential call-up. He signed a three and a half year contract extension with Forest in November 2019. 

In January 2020, a number of clubs including Milan, Everton and West Ham were interested in signing Cash. However, Cash said that he wished to stay at Forest until the end of the season in the hope that he could help the team to secure promotion to the Premier League. He cited Aston Villa's Jack Grealish as an influence behind this decision.

Cash was named Forest's Player of the Season by the club's supporters on 12 August 2020.

Aston Villa

On 3 September 2020, Aston Villa announced the signing of Cash on a five-year contract for a reported £14 million, rising to £16 million. Cash made his debut for the club on 21 September 2020, in a 1–0 home victory against Sheffield United. 

On 18 September 2021, Cash scored his first goal for Aston Villa in a 3–0 Premier League victory over Everton. On 26 February 2022, Cash scored a long-range effort in an away victory over Brighton & Hove Albion which was nominated for Premier League Goal of the Month. He received a yellow card for his celebration of the goal, in which Cash lifted his shirt to reveal a message of support for Poland teammate Tomasz Kędziora and his family, who were in Kyiv during the 2022 Russian invasion of Ukraine. Cash was voted Villa's player of the month for March 2022. On 4 April 2022, Cash signed a five-year contract extension with Aston Villa, amidst reported interest from Atlético Madrid.

On 12 May 2022, at Aston Villa's End of Season awards, Cash was voted Villa's Player of the Season for the 2021–22 season.

International career
Cash is of Polish descent through his mother. In September 2021, Cash applied for a Polish passport. His application for citizenship was signed on 26 October 2021 at the Masovian Voivodeship government building in Warsaw. On 1 November, Cash received his first call-up to the Poland national football team for their 2022 FIFA World Cup qualification matches against Andorra and Hungary. He made his first appearance in a 4–1 away victory against Andorra on 12 November. On 11 June 2022, Cash scored his first international goal in a 2–2 away UEFA Nations League draw against Netherlands.

Personal life
Cash is the son of former professional footballer Stuart Cash. His brother Adam coaches football at school-level. Cash grew up in Iver working in a branch of the department store Daniel prior to joining the Nottingham Forest academy.

Career statistics

Club

International

Poland score listed first, score column indicates score after each Cash goal.

Honours
Individual
Nottingham Forest Player of the Season 2019–20
Aston Villa Player of the Season 2021–22

References

External links

 Profile at the Aston Villa F.C. website
 

1997 births
Living people
Sportspeople from Slough
Footballers from Berkshire
English footballers
Polish footballers
Association football defenders
Association football midfielders
Nottingham Forest F.C. players
Dagenham & Redbridge F.C. players
Aston Villa F.C. players
English Football League players
Premier League players
2022 FIFA World Cup players
Poland international footballers
English people of Polish descent
Polish people of English descent
Citizens of Poland through descent